Lanna is a bimunicipal locality situated in Värnamo Municipality and Gnosjö Municipality in Jönköping County, Sweden with 329 inhabitants in 2010.

References 

Populated places in Jönköping County
Populated places in Gnosjö Municipality
Populated places in Värnamo Municipality
Finnveden